Bill Tobin (born February 16, 1941) is a former professional American football player who is currently a personnel executive for the Cincinnati Bengals of the National Football League (NFL). Tobin played running back for one season for the Houston Oilers. He would later become the general manager of the Chicago Bears and Indianapolis Colts along with the director of player personnel for the Detroit Lions in 2001.

Early life and education
Bill and his brother Vince Tobin both were born on a farm near Burlington Junction, Missouri.  Their father Ed Tobin was a basketball captain at the Conception Junction, Missouri high school.  The brothers both attended Maryville High School which is 16 miles from Burlington Junction but the family thought their sports prospects would be much better in the much bigger school (they commuted to the school). The brothers who are two years apart in age played on the football teams at the same time both in Maryville and at the University of Missouri football team.  Bill played on the 1959 Maryville basketball team that was undefeated until losing the State Class M title game.

Tobin attended the University of Missouri, where he played in the Tigers′ backfield next to quarterback Jim Johnson.

Career
During his time with the Indianapolis Colts, he drafted future Hall of Famers Marshall Faulk and Marvin Harrison.  He also drafted Ken Dilger, Tarik Glenn, and Adam Meadows, who would be cornerstones of the Colts offensive line. He also built a team in Indianapolis with Jim Harbaugh, who in 1995 led the NFL in passing and had a very successful run in the 1995 NFL playoffs, including the first playoff win for the Colts since Super Bowl V, a span of thirty years. He drafted Ray Buchanan and Ashley Ambrose, who later started for the Falcons in the Super Bowl.

Tobin was replaced as Colts general manager in 1997 by Bill Polian. Tobin is the brother of former NFL coach Vince Tobin.

Tobin was recently working as a scout for the Cincinnati Bengals.

Mel Kiper incident
While general manager of the Indianapolis Colts, Tobin gained some notoriety during the television broadcast of the 1994 NFL Draft after being criticized by ESPN analyst Mel Kiper Jr. for picking Nebraska linebacker Trev Alberts with the fifth pick in the draft, instead of Fresno State quarterback Trent Dilfer.

While being interviewed by ESPN later in the broadcast, Tobin famously said "Who in the hell is Mel Kiper?!" Tobin later called a press conference where he ranted about Kiper for several minutes, stating that Kiper had been biased against the Colts ever since they moved from Baltimore, Kiper's home.

References

1941 births
Living people
American football running backs
Edmonton Elks players
Houston Oilers players
Indianapolis Colts executives
Missouri Tigers football players
People from Nodaway County, Missouri
Players of American football from Missouri
American Football League players